Lebensreform ("life-reform") is the German generic term for various social reform movements, that started since the mid-19th century and originated especially in the German Empire and later in Switzerland. Common features were the criticism of industrialisation, materialism and urbanization combined with striving for the state of nature. The painter and social reformer Karl Wilhelm Diefenbach is considered to be an important pioneer of the Lebensreform ideas. The various movements did not have an overarching organization, but there were numerous associations. Whether the reform movements of the Lebensreform should be classified as modern or as anti-modern and reactionary is controversial. Both theses are represented.

Other important Lebensreform proponents were Sebastian Kneipp, Louis Kuhne, Rudolf Steiner, Hugo Höppener (Fidus), Gustav Gräser, and Adolf Just. One noticeable legacy of the Lebensreform movement in Germany today is the Reformhaus ("reform house"); retail stores that sell organic food and naturopathic medicine.

History
The Lebensreform movement in Germany was a politically diverse social reform movement. There were hundreds of groups across Germany dedicated to some or all of the concepts associated with the Lebensreform movement. Representatives of the Lebensreform propagated a natural way of life with ecology and organic farming, a vegetarian diet without alcoholic beverages and tobacco smoking, German dress reform and naturopathy. In doing so, they reacted to what they saw as the negative consequences of social changes in the 19th century. Spiritually, the Lebensreform turned to new religious and spiritual views, including theosophy, Mazdaznan and yoga. Many late neo-romanticism elements were also taken up, along with a glorification of the "simple life in the country". Dozens of magazines, journals, books, and pamphlets were published on these topics. Some groups were made of socialists, some were apolitical, and some were right-wing and nationalist in outlook.

The architectural form of the Lebensreform first came from settlement experiments such as Monte Verità, later in the garden city movement such as the Hellerau settlement and many others, the best-known representative of which was the reform architect Heinrich Tessenow (1876–1950), and the Bauhaus. The first establishment of a vegetarian settlement in Germany was the Vegetarian Fruit-Growing Colony Eden (Vegetarische Obstbau-Kolonie Eden) in Oranienburg near Berlin in 1893 formed by some 18 vegetarians from Berlin, later named the Eden Fruit-Growing Cooperative Settlement.

Lebensreform was a mainly bourgeois-dominated movement in which many women also participated. In the body culture (Körperkultur), it was about providing people with plenty of fresh air and sun to compensate for the effects of industrialization and urbanization.

Some areas of the Lebensreform movement, such as naturopathy or vegetarianism, were organized in associations and enjoyed great popularity, which is reflected in the number of members. To disseminate their content and principles, they published magazines such as Der Naturarzt (The Naturopath) or Die Vegetarische Warte (The Vegetarian Observer). Part of the Lebensreform movement also included the freikörperkultur (FKK, also naturism), the physical culture, gymnastics and expressionist dance. 

The German researcher  compared the Lebensreform to other social movements and found some specifics:
 The workers' movement was a mass movement interested in power politics and only secondarily in sociocultural issues. 
 After 1968, Germany (and other countries) saw the growth of the so-called New Social Movements such as the students' movement, the peace movement and the movement of the modern environmentalists. Those movements lacked a unified ideology, had no tight organization and were very diverse. Their members (not only the leaders) were highly educated, which was a result of the expansion of the German educational system in the 1960s. Typical for these movements was a certain enmity towards "leaders" and a preference for direct action, although these movements often changed the way they expressed themselves.
 The Lebensreform movements were much smaller groups that consisted often of academics. They had experienced an estrangement in modern society and tried to realign mankind and nature. They usually organized themselves in a traditional way, with lectures, clubs and magazines.

One outstanding prophet of the Lebensreform movement was the painter Karl Wilhelm Diefenbach (1861–1913), a pacifist and Tolstoyan anarchist who lived with his students in a hermitage in Höllriegelskreuth  near Munich and later founded the community  near Vienna. Among his disciples were three painters: Hugo Höppener (Fidus), František Kupka and Gustav Gräser. In 1900 Gräser became the cofounder and inspiring pioneer of the community Monte Verità near Ascona, Switzerland. Monte Verità attracted many artists from all of Europe, during World War I conscientious objectors from Germany and France. Gustav Gräser, a thinker and poet, greatly influenced the German Youth Movement and such writers as Hermann Hesse and Gerhart Hauptmann. He was the model for the master figures in the books of Hermann Hesse.  Richard Ungewitter and Heinrich Pudor were also well-known advocates of a strain of Lebensreform that emphasized nude culture (Nacktkultur) and was explicitly Völkisch in tradition, which eventually became the Freikörperkultur movement. The Freikörperkultur movement eventually broadened and came to include socialists with no strains of ethnic nationalism like the educationalist and gymnastics teacher Adolf Koch.

Effect in the United States
Some of the less well-known protagonists of the movement in Germany, such as Bill Pester, Benedict Lust and Arnold Ehret, emigrated to California at the end of the 19th and until the mid-20th century, where they strongly influenced the later hippie movement. One group, called themselves the "Nature Boys", settled as a commune in the California desert. One member of this group, eden ahbez, wrote the song Nature Boy, (recorded in 1947 by Nat King Cole), popularizing the "back-to-nature" movement in mainstream America. Eventually, a few of these Nature Boys, including Gypsy Boots, made their way to Northern California in 1967, just in time for the Summer of Love in San Francisco.

Today
Many contemporary environmental and other movements (the organic food movement, many fad diets and "back to nature" movements, as well as "folk movements"), have their roots in the Lebensreform movement's emphasis on the goodness of nature, the harms to society, people, and to nature caused by industrialization, the importance of the whole person, body and mind, and the goodness of "the old ways".

Right-wing radicalism
A specific stream based on völkisch Romanticism gradually became part of Nazi ideology by the 1930s, known as blood and soil. As early as 1907, Richard Ungewitter published a pamphlet called Wieder nacktgewordene Menschen (Again people become naked) which sold 100,000 copies, arguing that the practices he recommended would be "the means by which the German race would regenerate itself and ultimately prevail over its neighbours and the diabolical Jews, who were intent on injecting putrefying agents into the nation's blood and soil".

The extremists promoting right-wing ideology eventually became popular among Nazi Party officials and their supporters, including Heinrich Himmler and Rudolph Höss, who belonged to the right-wing farming organization the Artaman League. When other groups were being banned or disbanded due to political conflict during the 1930s, the extreme nationalist ideology became connected with National Socialism. The German Life Reform League broke apart into political factions during this time. The Nationalist physician Artur Fedor Fuchs began the League for Free Body Culture (FKK), giving public lectures on the healing powers of the sun in the "Nordic sky", which "alone strengthened and healed the warrior nation". Ancient forest living, and habits presumed to have been followed by the ancient tribes of Germany were beneficial to regenerating the Aryan people, according to Fuchs' philosophy. Hans Sùren, a prominent former military officer, published Man and the Sun (1924), which sold 240,000 copies; by 1941 it was reissued in 68 editions. Sùren promoted the Aryan master race concept of physically strong, militarized men who would be the "salvation" of the German people.

Contemporary books that influenced Lebensreform

  Also available as a PDF from the Soil and Health Library
Richard Ungewitter: Nakedness (1904), 
Arnold Ehret: Mucusless Diet Healing System (1922),  — PDF
Hermann Hesse: Siddhartha (1922)

See also

 Agrarianism
 Anarcho-naturism
 Anarcho-primitivism
 Back-to-the-land movement
 Bioregionalism
 Commune (intentional community)
 Communitarianism
 Deindustrialization
 Down to the Countryside Movement
 Ecovillage
 Green anarchism
 History of the hippie movement
 Localism
 Neo-Tribalism
 Physiocracy
 Permaculture
 Plain people
 Renewable energy
 Rural flight
 Self-sufficiency
 Simple living
 Subsistence agriculture
 Survivalism
 Sustainability
 Sustainable development
 Sustainable living
 Tolstoyan movement
 Wandervogel movement

Footnotes

Bibliography
Thorsten Carstensen & Marcel Schmid: Die Literatur der Lebensreform. Kulturkritik und Aufbruchstimmung um 1900. Bielefeld: transcript Verlag, 2016, 352 pp., 
Gordon Kennedy: Children of the Sun: A Pictorial Anthology From Germany To California 1883–1949. Nivaria Press (1998), 192 pp., 

John Williams: Turning to Nature in Germany: Hiking, Nudism, and Conservation, 1900–1940. Stanford University Press (2007), 368 pp., 
 Martin Green: Mountain of Truth. The Counterculture begins, Ascona, 1900-1920. University Press of New England, Hanover and London, 1986, 287 pp., 
 Friedhelm Kirchfeld & Wade Boyle: Nature Doctors. Pioneers in Naturopathic Medicine. Portland, Oregon,1994, 351 pp., 

Hippie movement
Counterculture
Free love advocates
Agrarian politics
German culture
German Youth Movement
Health in Germany
History of vegetarianism
Health in Austria
Health in Switzerland